Belliella pelovolcani  is a Gram-negative and non-motile bacterium from the genus of Belliella which has been isolated from a mud-volcano in Wandan in Taiwan.

References

External links
Type strain of Belliella pelovolcani at BacDive -  the Bacterial Diversity Metadatabase	

Cytophagia
Bacteria described in 2009